Cinematographer Style is a 2006 documentary film by Jon Fauer, ASC, about the art of cinematography. In the film, he interviews 110 leading cinematographers from around the world, asking them about their influences and the origins of the style of their films. This is the first major English-language documentary on cinematography since Visions of Light (1993).

References

External links
 Cinematographer Style

 Coolidge Corner Theatre Event

2006 films
American documentary films
Documentary films about cinematography
2006 documentary films
2000s English-language films
2000s American films
English-language documentary films